The Hart–Hoch House is a historic Federal style home, built c. 1800 in Hopewell Township, Mercer County, New Jersey, USA. It was added to the National Register of Historic Places on March 14, 1973.

See also
National Register of Historic Places listings in Mercer County, New Jersey

References

National Register of Historic Places in Mercer County, New Jersey
Houses in Mercer County, New Jersey
Hopewell Township, Mercer County, New Jersey
Houses completed in 1800
New Jersey Register of Historic Places
1800 establishments in New Jersey